Pearry Reginald Teo Zhang Pingli (23 July 1978 – 9 March 2023), commonly known as Pearry Teo, was a Singaporean filmmaker. He is considered the first Singaporean movie director to make a Hollywood film.

Biography 
Teo began his career with as a school drop out, making quirky horror films, with borrowed cameras. His first film, Liberata Me, won the New York International Film Festival for best horror film. Shortly after, his following films won him awards leading to his first feature film deal The Gene Generation.

A fashion design drop out, Teo attended school in Melbourne, Australia before arriving to the United States to pursue his career in filmmaking. His fan base comprises mostly those in the underground sub-culture, whose keen interest in him lies in his unique but dark visual style. The movie, The Gene Generation, stars Bai Ling and Faye Dunaway. The movie was released on DVD on 27 January 2009.

In August 2009, Teo shot NBC / Universal (Syfy) first production in China called Witchville which starred Luke Goss, MyAnna Buring and Sarah Douglas. The film premiered on 22 May 2010 in the USA via Syfy Channel.

In 2013, Teo collaborated with author Christine Converse on Bedlam Stories, a fictional account of famous reporter Nellie Bly's stay in a mental institution in the 1920s. The novel combines the fictional worlds of Alice in Wonderland and Wizard of Oz in a horror genre.

Teo died at his North Hollywood home on 9 March 2023, at the age of 44.

Filmography
 Liberata Me, aka Fade to Black  (USA) (2002) (director / writer / producer)
 Children of the Arcana (2003) (director / writer / producer)
 Take Me Somewhere Nice (2004) (director / writer / producer)
 The Gene Generation (2007) (director)
 Necromentia (2009) (director/co-writer)
 Witchville (2010) (director)
 The Evil Inside (2011) (director)
 Dracula: The Dark Prince (2013) (director)
 Strange Blood (2015) (writer / producer)
 The Curse of Sleeping Beauty (2016) (director / writer / producer)
 Pale Horse (2016) (director)
 Ghosthunters (2016) (director / writer)
 The Ghost Beyond (2018) (writer)
 The Assent (2019) (director / writer)
 Fast Vengeance (2021) (director / writer / film editor)
 Shadow Master (2022) (director / writer)
 19 HZ (2023) (director / writer)

References

External links
 Official Site
 Syfy's Saturday Night Movies

1978 births
2023 deaths
Singaporean people of Chinese descent
Singaporean film directors
Singaporean film producers
Singaporean screenwriters